Leonid Anatoliyovych Shaposhnikov (born 30 October 1969 in Khabarovsk) is a Ukrainian rower.

References 
 
 

1969 births
Living people
Ukrainian male rowers
People from Khabarovsk
Olympic rowers of Ukraine
Olympic rowers of the Unified Team
Rowers at the 1992 Summer Olympics
Rowers at the 1996 Summer Olympics
Rowers at the 2000 Summer Olympics
Rowers at the 2004 Summer Olympics
Olympic bronze medalists for Ukraine
Olympic medalists in rowing
World Rowing Championships medalists for the Soviet Union
Medalists at the 2004 Summer Olympics